John Harold Singer (4 December 1923 in Hastings, Sussex, England – 7 July 1987 in Tunbridge Wells, Kent, England), also known as Johnny Singer, was an English actor.

He began as a child actor, popular in the 1930s, and known for Sweeney Todd: The Demon Barber of Fleet Street (1936). In later years he continued to act in numerous films, including In Which We Serve (1942) and The Cruel Sea (1953). He died on 7 July 1987 in Tunbridge Wells, Kent, England. His son, Steven Singer, became a TV scriptwriter.

Filmography

 Further Up the Creek (1958) – as despatch rider
 Track the Man Down (1955) – as police detective (uncredited)
 Up to His Neck (1954) – as R/T rating (uncredited)
 Betrayed (1954) – as paratrooper (uncredited)
 Forbidden Cargo (1954) – as seaman (uncredited)
 The Cruel Sea (1953) – as Gray
 Come Back Peter (1953) as Ted
 The Brave Don't Cry (1952) – as Tam Stewart
 Whispering Smith Hits London (1952) – as 1st Photographer
 The Dark Man (1951) – as Captain
 School for Randle (1949) – as Ted Parker
 Poet's Pub (1949) – as Cox (uncredited)
 Haunted Palace (1949) (Short)
 It's Hard to Be Good (1948) – as Cameraman (uncredited)
 Fly Away Peter (1948) – as Ted Hapgood
 In Which We Serve (1942) – as Moran
 Front Line Kids (1942) – as Ginger Smith
 Somewhere in Camp (1942) – as Pvt. Jack Trevor
 Somewhere in England (1940) – as Bert Smith
 Riding High (1939) – as Simon (uncredited)
 Q Planes (1939) – as Newspaper Boy (uncredited)
 What a Man! (1938) – as Harold Bull
 St. Martin's Lane (1938) – as Autograph Hunter (uncredited)
 Youth at the Helm (TV Movie, 1938) – as Office Boy (credited as Johnny Singer)
 No Parking (1938) – as Boy (uncredited)
 Darts Are Trumps (1938) – as Jimmy
 If I Were Boss (1938) – as Boy (uncredited)
 The Live Wire (1937) – as Boy (uncredited)
 Smash and Grab (1937) – as Boy Who Discovers Body (uncredited)
 Mr. Smith Carries On (1937) – as Boy (uncredited)
 Strange Adventures of Mr. Smith (1937) – as Boy (uncredited)
 Don't Get Me Wrong (1937) – as Boy (uncredited)
 It's Never Too Late to Mend (1937) – as Matthew Josephs (credited as Johnny Singer)
 This'll Make You Whistle (1936) – as Small Boy With Chewing Gum (uncredited)
 Not So Dusty (1936) – as Johnny Clark
 Tudor Rose (1936) – as Boy (uncredited)
 This Green Hell (1936) – as Billy Foyle
 Sweeney Todd: The Demon Barber of Fleet Street (1936) – as Tobias Ragg (credited as Johnny Singer)
 King of the Castle (1936) – (uncredited)
 The Amateur Gentleman (1936) – as Boy (uncredited)
 Sweet Success (1936, Short) – as Boy in sweet shop (uncredited)
 Marry the Girl (1935) – as Office Boy (uncredited)
 Can You Hear Me, Mother? (1935) – as Boy (uncredited)
 Gay Old Dog (1935) – as Andrew V. Oakes (credited as Johnny Singer)
 The Price of a Song (1935) – as Boy (uncredited)
 Man of the Moment (1935) – as Small Boy (uncredited)
 The Phantom Light (1935) – as Cabin Boy (uncredited)
 The Black Room Mystery (1935) – as Raoul the Butler (uncredited)
 Royal Cavalcade (1935) – as Boy
 Street Song (1935) – as Billy
 Dandy Dick (1935) – as Freddie
 Emil and the Detectives (1935) – as Tuesday
 My Heart is Calling (1935) – as Page boy
 Open All Night (1934)
 My Old Dutch (1934) – as Jim as a Child
 Love at Second Sight (1934) – as Boy (uncredited)
 Something Always Happens (1934) – as Billy
 The Blue Squadron (1934) – as Boy (uncredited)
 Those Were the Days (1934) – as Boy (uncredited)
 Waltzes from Vienna (1934) – as Boy (uncredited)
 Facing the Music (1933) – as Boy (uncredited)
 The Pride of the Force (1933) – as Boy (uncredited)
 The Bermondsey Kid (1933) – as Boy (uncredited)
 I Was a Spy (1933) – as Boy (uncredited)
 Sleeping Car (1933) – as Page Boy (uncredited)
 King of the Ritz (1933) – as Pageboy
 The Crime at Blossoms (1933) – as Boy (uncredited)
 Looking on the Bright Side (1932) – as Boy (uncredited)
 Love on the Spot (1932) – as Pageboy
 Jack's the Boy (1932) – as Boy (uncredited)
 Lord Babs (1932) – as Boy (uncredited)
 The Black Hand Gang (1930) – as Boy (uncredited)
 High Treason (1929) – as Boy (uncredited)

References

External links

English male child actors
People from Royal Tunbridge Wells
1923 births
1987 deaths
People from Hastings